Kevin Miles (born 17 April 1929) is an Australian retired actor of theatre and television best known for his role as Godfrey Carson in the Australian television legal drama Carson's Law. Miles also appeared in Delta (1969), Dynasty (1970) and The Power, The Passion (1989).

Miles was born in Melbourne, Victoria and started his career in theatre in 1949 and TV roles from 1955, he was best known for his roles in TV serials and telemovies until retiring in 1997.

Filmography

Awards
In 1971 Kevin Miles won a Penguin Commendation for his portrayal of David Mason in the Australian 1970s television series Dynasty and in 1984 he was awarded a Logie Award for Best Lead Actor in a Series for the role of Godfrey Carson (Carson's Law)

References

External links
http://members.ozemail.com.au/~fangora/carsons.html 
http://www.classicaustraliantv.com/dynasty.htm
http://www.tv.com/people/kevin-miles/
http://www.classicaustraliantv.com/dynasty_eps.htm

 
1929 births
Living people
Australian male television actors
Male actors from Melbourne
20th-century Australian male actors
Logie Award winners